Willem Doesburg (28 October 1943 – 18 November 2020) was a football goalkeeper who obtained eight caps for the Netherlands national football team in 1967–1981.

Doesburg is the Eredivisie record holder for matches played, with 687 games in a 25-year career.

Club career
He made his senior debut for Sparta Rotterdam in August 1962 against Blauw-Wit and played 471 Eredivisie matches for them in two spells with the club and won the 1966 KNVB Cup. He also played over 200 games for PSV Eindhoven, winning the Dutch title twice (1986 and 1987).

International career
Doesburg made his debut for the Netherlands in an April 1967 friendly match against Belgium and earned eight caps. He played one match at the 1980 European Championships versus Greece in Naples, coming on as a substitute to replace Piet Schrijvers in the 15th minute of a 1–0 win. His final international game was in February 1981 against Cyprus.

Personal life
Doesburg was born on 28 October 1943 in Rotterdam, South Holland. After his career ended, he became a keepers coach, and worked for Feyenoord. He died on 17 November 2020 at the age of 77. His grandson Pepijn Doesburg also became a professional footballer. He credited his grandfather with passing on advice around the mental toughness required to play professionally which helped Pepijn with the mentality required to help overcome injuries in his career.

Honours

Club
Sparta
KNVB Cup: 1965–66,

PSV
Eredivisie: 1985–86, 1986–87

References

External links

 VoetbalFocus 
 

1943 births
2020 deaths
1978 FIFA World Cup players
Association football goalkeepers
Association football goalkeeping coaches
Dutch footballers
Eredivisie players
Footballers from Rotterdam
Netherlands international footballers
PSV Eindhoven players
Sparta Rotterdam players

UEFA Euro 1980 players